Johann Jakob Breitinger (1 March 1701 in Zürich – 14 December 1776) was a Swiss philologist and author.

Life 

Breitinger studied theology and philology and first earned recognition from 1730 through a new edition of the Septuaginta. From 1731 he worked as Professor of Hebrew and later of Greek in the gymnasium in Zürich. Breitinger was however best known for his collaborations with his friend Johann Jakob Bodmer. In their joint work it cannot always to be distinguished, from whom most of the suggestions came. The main part of the historical collection Thesaurus Historicae Helveticae (1735) may be attributed to Breitinger.

Breitinger's principal work Critische Dichtkunst (1740) was a rejection of the traditional poetic principle of imitation of nature for the benefit of the creative imagination; it had a big influence on German literary theory and the burgeoning genius cult. In this context was also the literary-historically significant dispute of Bodmer and Breitinger with Johann Christoph Gottsched.

Works 

 Kritische Abhandlung von der Natur, den Absichten und dem Gebrauche der Gleichnisse, 1740
 Critische Dichtkunst, 1740
 Verteidigung der schweizerischen Muse Herrn D. A. Hallers, 1744

Further reading 

 Wolfgang Bender: Johann Jakob Bodmer und Johann Jakob Breitinger. Metzler, Stuttgart 1973. (= Sammlung Metzler; 113) 
 Thomas Brunnschweiler: Johann Jakob Breitingers "Bedencken von Comoedien oder Spilen". Die Theaterfeindlichkeit im alten Zürich. Edition - Kommentar - Monographie. Lang, Bern u.a. 1989. (= Zürcher germanistische Studien; 17) 
 Uwe Möller: Rhetorische Ueberlieferung und Dichtungstheorie im frühen 18. Jahrhundert. Studien zu Gottsched, Breitinger und Georg Friedrich Meier. Fink, München 1983.

External links 

 Kurzbiografie von Johann Jakob Breitinger 
 NZZ zum 300. Geburtstag von Johann Jakob Breitinger 

1701 births
1776 deaths
Swiss literary critics
Swiss male writers
Writers from Zürich